The Mona are a Mandinka people from West Africa living in west-central Côte d'Ivoire, in the Mankono department.

Ethnonymy
According to the sources and the context, we observe different forms: Ganmu, Monas, Mono, Mouan, Mouâ, Mouin, Muana, Muan, Mwanu, Mwa, Mwe.

Language
Their language is Mona (or Mwan), a Mande language whose number of speakers was estimated at 20,000 in 2012.

References

Bibliography
Alain-Michel Boyer, Les Wan, Mona et Koyaka de Côte d'Ivoire: the sacred, the secret, Fondation Culturelle Musée Barbier-Mueller, Hazan, Paris, 2011, 175 p.

Ethnic groups in Ivory Coast